This could refer to:
 Yohannes I of Ethiopia (1640–1672)
 Yohannes II of Ethiopia (1699–1769)
 Yohannes III of Ethiopia (1797–1873)
 Yohannes IV of Ethiopia (1838-1889)